Rick Smith Jr. (born 5 March 1981) is a professional illusionist and card thrower from Cleveland, Ohio. Smith is best known for his numerous nationally televised performances as well as his three world records for throwing a playing card the greatest distance, greatest height, and most accurately. Deriving his throwing skills from his time as an NCAA Division I pitcher at Cleveland State University, he has also released a number of instructional films regarding the practices of magic and card throwing.

Early life 
Rick Smith Jr. was born and raised in Lyndhurst, Ohio, a suburb on the eastern side of the city of Cleveland. He attended the St. Clare School until eighth grade, then transferred to Charles F. Brush High School where he graduated.

Smith began practicing magic at a young age, teaching himself tricks and buying props from the local magic store. He would perform for the residents of his neighborhood in his basement, eventually moving on to shows at local parties where he would charge a small fee for a stage performance.

After high school, Smith enrolled at Cleveland State University where he studied Marketing and Business Management. During his time as a student he played baseball for the CSU Vikings, pitching for their NCAA team.

Career 
Rick Smith Jr.’s career unofficially began during the second half of his time at CSU when he realized that his ability in card throwing could help him break world records and move quickly into the spotlight. After throwing a card at a friend in jest and accidentally slicing his arm, it became clear that Smith possessed an unusual talent for the sport. In the days and weeks that followed, he alerted the local press that he would be attempting to break the record for distance of a playing card throw in CSU’s Wolstein Center. On March 21 of 2002, at the age of 21, Smith obtained the world record for the farthest distance a playing card had ever been thrown.

After his accomplishment was publicized on Cleveland’s newspapers and TV channels, Smith began to be contacted by national television programs who requested that he perform his first live televised card throwing stunt on their show. He made his first TV appearance on Ripley’s Believe It Or Not, demonstrating his card throwing abilities in speed, distance, and precision.

Since making his debut on Ripley’s Believe It Or Not in 2002, Smith has appeared on national television a number of times. His performances have been broadcast live on shows such as The Ellen Degeneres Show, Shark Tank, The Tonight Show, and America’s Got Talent. He has also appeared twice on Dude Perfect, a popular YouTube channel that records videos involving tricks and stunts.  The first of these videos went viral and reached around 150 million views within three years.  He has also been involved in the YouTube Red series, The Super Slow Show, starring Gavin Free and Daniel Gruchy, showing off his card throwing ability to cut through almost three whole celery stalks.

In addition to making appearances on the above broadcasts, Smith performs for individual clients as well as national corporations at events around the United States. His shows often include a combination of magic and card throwing stunts, many of which involve audience participation.

Smith is also the founder and director of Magic Gives Back, an organization dedicated to raising money for school systems across the United States. Along with a group of performers, Smith organizes events in conjunction with school districts looking to bring in money for education-related projects and puts on pro-bono shows, the proceeds of which go to the school.

World records 
Rick Smith Jr. currently holds three Guinness World Records for his work in card throwing:
 The world record for the farthest playing card throw at 216 feet 4 inches (3/21/02)
The world record for the highest playing card throw at 70 feet 3 inches (3/14/15)
The most playing cards thrown around a human target in one minute is 51 and was achieved by Rick Smith Jr (USA) on the set of Lo Show dei Record in Milan, Italy, on 09 February 2022.
He previously held the world record for the most accurate playing card throwing 50 out of 52 cards into a 12 inch radius target. This was beaten by Travis Stich on the 23rd February 2021

Filmography 
Throughout his career, Smith has released a series of instructional movies aimed at audiences hoping to learn the basics of magic or card throwing. His releases include: Xtreme Beginnerz Card Handling Skills, which explains the basics of card throwing, pen spinning, and dice stacking; The Art of Card Throwing with Rick Smith Jr., which explains techniques for card throwing in greater detail; and Velocity (in collaboration with Murphy’s Magic), which also launches into the specific practices and skills necessary to be a masterful card thrower.

References

External links 
 
 Rick's Business Website

American magicians
Living people
America's Got Talent contestants
Cleveland State Vikings baseball players
1981 births